Roland Schwarz (born 8 April 1937) was a German sailor, born in Berlin, who competed in the 1972 Summer Olympics.

References

1937 births
Living people
Sportspeople from Berlin
East German male sailors (sport)
Olympic sailors of East Germany
German male sailors (sport)
Sailors at the 1972 Summer Olympics – Soling
European Champions Soling